Daqi-1 or Atmospheric Environment Monitoring Satellite is a Chinese satellite which was launched on 15 April 2022 to study the atmosphere of the Earth.  Its Aerosol and Carbon Detection Lidar (ACDL) instrument was thought to be the most likely cause of a green laser light display observed over Hawaii on 28 January 2023 by the Subaru Telescope, although initially thought to be from a remote-sensing altimeter satellite ICESat-2.

References

Earth observation satellites